The 1979 Transamerica Open, also known as the Pacific Coast Championships,  was a men's tennis tournament played on indoor carpet courts at the Cow Palace in San Francisco, California in the United States. The event was part of the 1979 Colgate-Palmolive Grand Prix circuit. It was the 91st edition of the tournament and was held from September 24 through September 30, 1979. The singles event had a field of 64 players. First-seeded John McEnroe won his second consecutive singles title at the event.

Finals

Singles
 John McEnroe defeated  Peter Fleming 4–6, 7–5, 6–2
 It was McEnroe's 8th singles title of the year and the 13th of his career.

Doubles
 Peter Fleming /  John McEnroe defeated  Wojciech Fibak /  Frew McMillan 6–1, 6–4

References

External links
 ITF tournament edition details

Pacific Coast International Open
Pacific Coast International Open
Pacific Coast International Open
Pacific Coast International Open
Transamerica Open